Satara may refer to:

Places 
 Satara (city), Maharashtra, India
 Satara district, Maharashtra, India
 Satara (Lok Sabha constituency)
 Satara (Vidhan Sabha constituency)
 Satara railway station
 Satara state, a former princely state

People
 Satara Murray (born 1993), American association footballer

Other uses 
 Satara (moth), a genus of moths in the family Erebidae